2-Hydroxyestriol, also known as estra-1,3,5(10)-triene-2,3,16α,17β-tetrol, is an endogenous catechol estrogen and metabolite of estriol. It is a suspected carcinogen of carcinogenicity category 2.

See also
 4-Hydroxyestriol
 2-Methoxyestriol

References

Phenols
Cyclopentanols
Sterols
Carcinogens
Estranes
Human metabolites